

Secret Rocks Nature Reserve is a private protected area located in South Australia about  east of the town of Kimba on the Eyre Peninsula in the state's Far North region.  The nature reserve has protected area status due being to the subject of a native vegetation heritage agreement created in 2007 under the Native Vegetation Act 1991 (SA) where its owner, Ecological Horizons Pty Ltd, has agreed to protect the property's native vegetation in perpetuity. The nature reserve is bounded on its east side by the Ironstone Hill Conservation Park.  It is classified as an IUCN Category III protected area.

See also
 Protected areas of South Australia

References

External links
official webpage

Private protected areas of South Australia
Protected areas established in 2007
2007 establishments in Australia
Eyre Peninsula
Far North (South Australia)